Prince Tasziló Festetics de Tolna (5 May 1850 – 4 May 1933) was a member of the Hungarian noble family of Festetics.

Early life 
He was born in Vienna, the son of Count György Festetics de Tolna, who served as Minister of Foreign Affairs of Hungary from 1867 to 1871, and Countess Eugénia Erdõdy de Monyorókerék et Monoszló (1826-1894).

Marriage and family 
In 1880 Festetics married Lady Mary Victoria Douglas-Hamilton (11 December 1850, Hamilton Palace – 14 May 1922, Budapest), former wife of Albert I, Prince of Monaco. The couple had four children:

 Countess Mária Matild Georgina Festetics de Tolna  (24 May 1881, Baden-Baden – 2 March 1953, Strobl am Wolfgangsee), who married Prince Karl Emil von Fürstenberg. Their grandchildren include Ira von Fürstenberg, Prince Egon von Fürstenberg, and Prince Karl von Schwarzenberg.
 Prince György Tasziló József Festetics de Tolna (4 September 1882, Baden-Baden – 4 August 1941, Keszthely); who married Countess Marie Franziska von Haugwitz.
 Countess Alexandra Olga Eugénia Festetics de Tolna (1 March 1884, Baden-Baden – 23 April 1963, Vienna); who was married first to Prince Karl von Windisch-Grätz (brother-in-law of Archduchess Elisabeth Marie of Austria) and later to Prince Erwin zu Hohenlohe-Waldenburg-Schillingsfürst,
 Countess Karola Friderika Mária Festetics de Tolna (17 January 1888, Vienna — 21 January 1951, Strobl); who was married to Baron Oskar Gautsch von Frankenthurn, son of Baron Paul Gautsch von Frankenthurn, Minister-President of Cisleithania.

Title of Prince 
On 21 June 1911 Count Tasziló Festetics de Tolna was made a Prince with the style Serene Highness (Durchlaucht) by Emperor Francis Joseph I of Austria.

Death 
He died at Festetics Palace, Keszthely, the day before his 83rd birthday. His grandson Georg (born 1940) is the current head of the house.

See also 
 Festetics family

References 

1850 births
1933 deaths
Austrian princes
Nobility from Vienna
Hungarian nobility
Taszilo